The 2024 United States Senate election in Michigan will be held on November 5, 2024, to elect a Class I member of the United States Senate to represent the state of Michigan. It will be held concurrently with the 2024 United States presidential election, other elections to the United States Senate, other elections to the United States House of Representatives, and various state and local elections.

Incumbent Democratic Senator Debbie Stabenow was re-elected with 52.3% of the vote in 2018. She was first elected in 2000, defeating one-term Republican incumbent Spencer Abraham. On January 5, 2023, Stabenow announced that she would not be seeking re-election to a fifth term in office. This will be the first open race for this seat since 1994.

Democratic primary

Candidates

Declared

Announcement pending
Hill Harper, actor and author (announcement expected in April 2023)

Formed exploratory committee
Nasser Beydoun, businessman and former executive director of the Arab American Chamber of Commerce (decision expected in spring 2023)

Publicly expressed interest
Leslie Love, former state representative for the 10th district (2014–2020)
Pamela Pugh, president of the Michigan State Board of Education (2015–present)

Potential
Jocelyn Benson, Michigan Secretary of State (2019–present)
Mark Hackel, Macomb County Executive (2011–present)
Barbara McQuade, former U.S. Attorney for the Eastern District of Michigan (2010–2017)

Declined
Pete Buttigieg, U.S. Secretary of Transportation (2021–present), former Mayor of South Bend, Indiana (2012–2020), and candidate for President of the United States in 2020
Mike Duggan, Mayor of Detroit (2014–present)
Abdul El-Sayed, CNN contributor, former executive director of the Detroit Department of Health and Wellness Promotion, and candidate for Governor of Michigan in 2018
Garlin Gilchrist, Lieutenant Governor of Michigan (2019–present)
Karen McDonald, Oakland County Prosecutor (2021–present)
Mallory McMorrow, state senator for the 8th district (2019–present)
Dana Nessel, Michigan Attorney General (2019–present)
Debbie Stabenow, incumbent U.S. Senator (2001–present)
Gretchen Whitmer, Governor of Michigan (2019–present)

Endorsements

Republican primary

Candidates

Declared 
Michael Hoover, pest control business owner
Nikki Snyder, member of the Michigan State Board of Education

Publicly expressed interest 
Ruth Johnson, state senator for the 14th district (2019–present) and former Michigan Secretary of State (2011–2019)
Kevin Rinke, businessman and candidate for Governor of Michigan in 2022

Potential
Mike Cox, former Michigan Attorney General (2003–2011)
James Craig, former Chief of the Detroit Police Department (2013–2021) and candidate for Governor of Michigan in 2022
Betsy DeVos, former U.S. Secretary of Education (2017–2021) and former chair of the Michigan Republican Party (1996–2000, 2003–2005)
Ryan Kelley, former Allendale Planning Commissioner, participant in the January 6 Capitol attack, and candidate for Governor of Michigan in 2022
Aric Nesbitt, Minority Leader of the Michigan Senate (2023–present) from the 26th district (2019–present)
Matthew Schneider, former U.S. Attorney for the Eastern District of Michigan (2018–2021)
Bill Schuette, former Michigan Attorney General (2011–2019), nominee for U.S. Senate in 1990, and nominee for Governor of Michigan in 2018
Mike Shirkey, former Majority Leader of the Michigan Senate (2019–2023) from the 16th district (2015–2023)

Declined
Brian Calley, former Lieutenant Governor of Michigan (2011–2019) and candidate for Governor of Michigan in 2018
Tudor Dixon, conservative media personality and nominee for Governor of Michigan in 2022
Perry Johnson, businessman and candidate for Governor of Michigan in 2022 (running for president)

Independents and third-party candidates

Potential

General election

Predictions

References

External links
 Nikki Snyder (R) for Senate
 Elissa Slotkin (D) for Senate

2024
Michigan
United States Senate